AZ or AZ Vrouwen was a women's association football club based in Alkmaar and the Zaanstreek, Netherlands. They were affiliated with the AZ men's team. They were founder members of the Eredivisie Vrouwen in 2007 and won the first three editions of the championship. In February 2011 AZ announced they were withdrawing support for their women's section, for financial reasons.

Telstar entered a team in the 2011–12 women's Eredivisie and most of the AZ players signed for the newly formed club.

In Januari 2022 AZ announced they were looking into restarting with a women's section. Two months later AZ revealed they were going to financially support and were working closely with VV Alkmaar.

Honours
National
 National champion
 Winners (1): 2008, 2009, 2010
 KNVB Women's Cup
 Winners (1): 2011

Results Eredivisie

Former players

European competition

References

 
Association football clubs established in 2007
Association football clubs disestablished in 2011
2007 establishments in the Netherlands
2011 disestablishments in the Netherlands
Football clubs in Alkmaar
Women's football clubs in the Netherlands
Eredivisie (women) teams